This is the complete list of men's Universiade medalists in athletics from 1959 to 2019.

Events

100m

200m

400m

800m

1500m

5000m

10,000m

Marathon

Half marathon

110 hurdles

400m hurdles

3000m steeplechase

4x100m relay

4x400m relay

20km walk

20km walk team

Half marathon team

High jump

Pole vault

Long jump

Triple jump

Shot put

Discus

Hammer throw

Javelin

Decathlon

Pentathlon

References

Universiade
Universiade